Septaria porcellana borbonica is a subspecies of freshwater snail, a gastropod mollusk in the family Neritidae.

Septaria porcellana borbonica  is the type species of the genus Septaria.

Distribution
Distribution of Septaria porcellana borbonica includes South Africa and islands in the Indian Ocean.

The type locality is Réunion Island.

References

  Bory de St. Vincent J. B. (1804). Voyage dans les quatre principales Iles des Mers d'Afrique. Paris, Buisson 408 p. Atlas pl. 1 + 56
 Drivas, J.; Jay, M. (1987). Coquillages de La Réunion et de l'Île Maurice. Collection Les Beautés de la Nature. Delachaux et Niestlé: Neuchâtel. . 159 pp.

External links
 Montfort P. [Denys de]. (1808-1810). Conchyliologie systématique et classification méthodique des coquilles. Paris: Schoell. Vol. 1: pp. lxxxvii + 409 
 Martens, E. von. (1881-1882). Die Gattung Navicella. In: Küster, H. C.; Kobelt, W., Weinkauff, H. C., Eds. Systematisches Conchylien-Cabinet von Martini und Chemnitz. Neu herausgegeben und vervollständigt. Zweiten Bandes zehnte Abtheilung A. 2 (10a): 1-56, pls 1-8. Nürnberg : Bauer & Raspe (publication dates: 1-40, pls 1-6
 Abdou, A. (2021). New taxonomic and phylogeographic data on three nominal species of the genus Septaria Férussac, 1807 (Gastropoda: Cycloneritida: Neritidae). Zootaxa. 4915 (1): 28-40

Neritidae
Gastropods described in 1803